Peter Hola (born 27 April 1999) is a professional rugby league footballer who plays as a  for the Canberra Raiders in the NRL. 

He previously played for the North Queensland Cowboys in the National Rugby League.

Background
Hola was born in Sydney, New South Wales, Australia. He is of Tongan descent, and was raised in Auckland, New Zealand.

He played his junior rugby league for the Marist Saints. He attended Avondale College and was signed by the North Queensland Cowboys after being spotted at the 2016 New Zealand Schoolboys carnival.

Playing career

Early career
In 2017, Hola moved to Townsville, Queensland, where he joined the Cowboys NYC squad. He began the season playing for the Townsville Blackhawks Mal Meninga Cup side before moving up to the Cowboys NYC side and playing eight games. In September 2017, he represented the New Zealand under-18 side in their loss to the Australian Schoolboys.

In 2018, Hola played for the Northern Pride in the Hastings Deering Colts competition, winning their under-20 Best and Fairest award, and made his Queensland Cup debut for them later that season. On 13 October, he played for the Junior Kiwis in their loss to the Junior Kangaroos at Mt Smart Stadium.

2019
On 19 February, Hola re-signed with the North Queensland club until the 2022 season and joined their NRL squad. He began the season playing for the Northern Pride in the Queensland Cup.

In Round 21 of the 2019 NRL season, Hola made his NRL debut in an 14–18 loss to the Brisbane Broncos. He ended his rookie season with five appearances for the North Queensland side.

2020
In February, Hola was a member of the North Queensland's 2020 NRL Nines winning squad. Hola's playing time was limited in 2020 due to injuries. In Round 9, after four appearances for North Queensland, he dislocated his wrist in a 16–42 loss to the Sydney Roosters, which kept him out for the rest of the season.

2021
Hola signed a deal to join the Canberra Raiders on a two-year deal starting with the 2022 season.

Achievements and accolades

Team
2020 NRL Nines: North Queensland Cowboys – Winners

Statistics

NRL
 Statistics are correct to the end of the 2020 season

References

External links
North Queensland Cowboys profile
NRL profile

1999 births
Living people
Australian rugby league players
New Zealand rugby league players
Australian sportspeople of Tongan descent
New Zealand sportspeople of Tongan descent
North Queensland Cowboys players
Northern Pride RLFC players
Rugby league props
Rugby league locks
Rugby league players from Sydney